Miss World Philippines 2019 was the 9th edition of the Miss World Philippines pageant. It was held at the Smart Araneta Coliseum in Quezon City, Metro Manila, Philippines on September 15, 2019. Katarina Sonja Rodriguez crowned Michelle Daniela Dee as her successor at the end of the event.

The Miss World Philippines Organization crowned a new set of winners for 2019. Michelle Dee garnered the most coveted title of Miss World Philippines 2019, while five additional titleholders were also elected: Kelley Day as Miss Eco Philippines 2019, Maria Katrina Llegado as Reina Hispanoamericana Filipinas 2019, Isabelle de Leon as Miss Multinational Philippines 2019, Glyssa Leiann Perez as Miss Tourism Philippines 2019, and Vanessa-Mae Walters as Miss Teen Eco International Philippines 2019 and later was dethroned and replaced by Mary Daena Zaide Resurrecion to represent the Philippines at Miss Teen Eco International 2019.

Results 
Color keys
  The contestant was a Finalist/Runner-up in an International pageant.
  The contestant was a Semi-Finalist in an International pageant.

Appointed titleholder
A Filipina was appointed to compete internationally in 2020 since the national pageant was not held in 2020 due to the COVID-19 pandemic.

Awards
Different sets of awards were given in this edition.

Special Awards

Sponsor Awards

Fast Track Events 
Fast Track Events winners are as follows:

Contestants 
40 delegates competed in this edition.

Judges
The following served as a judge on the coronation night of Miss World Philippines 2019:
 Bryce Ramos - Actor & Commercial Model
 Nancy Go - Operations Manager, BlueWater Day Spa
 Sean Wong - National Director, Miss World Singapore & Miss World Malaysia
 Jun Omar Ebdane - Provincial Administrator, Zambales
 Sunshine Cruz - Actress
 Jeffrey Lin - CEO, GCOX Singapore
 Roselle Monteverde - Vice President and Executive Producer, Regal Films
 Maritel Nievera - President and CEO, Cabalen
 Sean Michael Afable - Hollywoord Actor, Writer & Director
 Kristine Lim - Assistant Vice President for Marketing, Suyen Corporation
 Raymond Bagatsing - Actor
 Nikki Coseteng - Former Philippines' Senator
 Amaal Rezk -  and CEO, Miss Eco International
 Hon. Francis Zamora - Mayor of San Juan
 Hon. Isko Moreno Domagoso - Mayor of Manila (chairman of the board)

References

External links 
 

2019
2019 beauty pageants
2019 in the Philippines